Doncaster Rovers Academy is the youth team run by Doncaster Rovers to encourage and develop young footballers in South Yorkshire.

The youth team runs 9 teams and has over 100 players from the ages of 8 to 17. Tony Cook is the current academy manager and was promoted to this position in January 2019 after initially joined the club as head of academy coaching in September 2017. The academy team plays in the Football League Youth Alliance, North East Conference and is only for players below the age of 18. Home games are played at the club's training ground at Cantley Park.

The role of the Doncaster Rovers Academy is to develop players and their abilities to their full potential for the club's first team. Rovers youth team were runners-up of the FA Youth Cup in 1988 and the winners of the Youth Alliance Cup in 2012. The youth system currently has Category 3 status but with future plans to achieve Category 2 status Academy in the Elite Player Performance Plan which would make Doncaster one of the few teams outside the Premier League with Category 2 status.

Current squad

Players listed in bold have signed a professional deal with Doncaster Rovers but are still eligible to play for the U18's.

Staff

Age Groups
There are currently 9 squads at the Academy.

 Under 18
 Under 16
 Under 15
 Under 14
 Under 13
 Under 12
 Under 11
 Under 10
 Under 9

Notable Academy Graduates
The following are players from Doncaster's academy team past or present who have gone on to play in the top 2 tiers of the Football League, or the top tier in another country with prominent national leagues.

References

Academy
Football academies in England